Wang Xiaochuan (born October 3, 1978) is a Chinese  Internet entrepreneur and investor. He is the founder and chief executive officer of Sogou Inc., China's No.2 Internet search engine, and a leading Artificial Intelligence company in China.During his tenure as CEO of Sogou, a listed company, Wang led the team to develop China's dominated intelligent Chinese input method.On October 15, 2021, following the completion of a merger with Tencent, Dr. Wang stepped down as CEO of Sogou and announced that he would "enter the healthcare industry for the coming 20 years, after having spent the past 21 years in the internet industry".

Wang won the Yilida Youth Invention Award  (an award initiated by Nobel Laureate Chen Ning Yang) at the age of 16 and was a recipient of the gold medal at the 8th International Olympiad in Informatics (IOI). At 27, Wang became Chief Technology Officer of Sohu Inc. He graduated from Tsinghua University with a Ph.D. in Computer Science and has served as the co-Chair of the Tiangong Institute for Intelligent Computing of Tsinghua University.

Early life and education
Wang was born in 1978 in Chengdu, Sichuan Province.Wang began using computers and writing software when he was seven. Since elementary school, Wang received prizes in programming contests aimed at middle school students.

In 1990, Wang ranked NO.1 in the city-wide admission exam to ChengduNo.7 High School(middle school).

In 1993, Wang was admitted to Chengdu No.7 High School (high school) after winning the first prize in the National Mathematics Competition.

In 1994, Wang completed all proof of elementary geometry proposition for the first time, using a microcomputer with Wu's elimination method. For this work, he won the Yilida Youth Invention Award (an award initiated by Nobel Laureate Chen Ning Yang). In 1994, when Vice Premier Li Lanqing visited Chengdu Seventh Middle School, he saw Wang's computer operation performance.

In 1996, he won a gold medal at the 8th International Olympiad in Informatics (IOI)and was admitted to Tsinghua University(known as the "Harvard of China ")

Wang studied at Tsinghua University and earned Bachelor of Science and master's degrees in computer science and an EMBA degree there. Wang also earned his Doctorate in Computer Science and Technology from Tsinghua University.

Internet experience 
Wang entered China's Internet startup sector while still an undergraduate student. In 1999, he participated in the creation of the online alumni directory of ChinaRen.com as a part-time technical manager. His work continued after ChinaRen, In 2003, after completing his postgraduate studies at Tsinghua University, Wang joined Sohu after ChinaRen was acquired by Sohu, Wang's talent attracted the attention of Charles Zhang, the founder and CEO of Sohu, Wang rose from senior technical manager to senior technical director, deputy president, senior vice-president, and CTO. At 27，Wang became the youngest Vice President of this company. Wang was appointed as the CTO of Sohu at the age of 31.

Founding of Sogou and career
In 2003, Wang established Sohu's R&D Center, Wang recruited students in the computer department of Tsinghua University, international gold medals in the computer Olympic Games, top winners in the college entrance examination to form a dream team，Wang launched Sogou Search in 2004. In 2006, he invented the Sogou intelligent Input Method, which later became China's most popular input method, anchoring Sogou as China's No.2 Internet property by user numbers. In 2008, Wang proposed the "Input-Browser-Search" internet business model, namely the "three-stage rocket model". In 2010, after facilitating the spin-off of Sogou from Sohu, Wang started serving as the CEO of Sogou, opening a new chapter for the company.

Two months after Wang took office in 2010, Alibaba invested $15 million in exchange for 10% of Sogou's shares. In 2013, Wang persuaded Tencent to invest $448 million in Sogou and merged Tencent's search Department into Sogou, thereby changing the Internet pattern, which was also Wang's important work in that year. "

On November 9, 2017, under the leadership of Wang, Sogou was listed on NYSE as ticker "SOGO", at a valuation of $5 billion.

Research collaboration 
On March 16, 2007, Wang led Sogou and the Department of computer science and technology of Tsinghua University to establish Sogou Tsinghua joint laboratory.In 2016, Wang initiated the donation of 180 million RMB from Sogou to Tsinghua to establish the Tiangong Institute for Intelligent Computing of Tsinghua University. Wang was named Co-Chair of the institute. Wang also led Sogou to establish SogouT-16, a free-of-charge public Chinese Web collection, which has provided invaluable resources for further novel academic research in computer science.

Investment experience 
On October 15, 2021, Wang resigned as CEO of Sogou and announced that he would open a new chapter in the medical field. In recent years, Dr. Wang has invested in the field of medical technology, including Dr. Chunyu, a listed company of telemedicine platform, a Chinese medicine consulting service Xiaolu traditional Chinese medicine, Airdoc Technology, the first "AI medical stock" listed in Hong Kong (airdoc 02251.hk), and DeepCare,an AI oral imaging company, Dr. Wang wrote, "my curiosity about life science has been lingering in my mind for the past 20 years. In the next 20 years, if I can make my own contributions to the development of health care and life science, and to the improvement of public health, I will live a fuller life".

Honors
In 1996, Wang won a gold medal at the Eighth International Olympiad in Informatics (IOI). In 2014, he was the winner of the Emerging Entrepreneur award of Ernst & Young China Entrepreneur of the Year.

References

1978 births
Living people
Chinese chief executives
Businesspeople from Chengdu
Tsinghua University alumni
21st-century Chinese businesspeople